James Michael Pittsley (April 3, 1974), is a retired Major League Baseball player who played pitcher from -. He  played for the Kansas City Royals and Milwaukee Brewers. James Pittsley was drafted out of DuBois Area High School. He was drafted by the Kansas City Royals in the 1992 MLB Draft (17th pick overall).   Pittsley was a highly touted prospect but was injured early in his career, and he only won seven major league games.

References

External links

1974 births
Living people
People from DuBois, Pennsylvania
Kansas City Royals players
Milwaukee Brewers players
Major League Baseball pitchers
Baseball players from Pennsylvania
Baseball City Royals players
Gulf Coast Royals players
Rockford Royals players
Wilmington Blue Rocks players
Omaha Royals players
Wichita Wranglers players
Louisville RiverBats players